Karakul (Qarakül) is a rural locality (a village) in Irnykshinsky Selsoviet, Arkhangelsky District, Bashkortostan, Russia. The population was 44 as of 2010. There are 2 streets.

Geography 
Karakul is located 19 km northwest of Arkhangelskoye (the district's administrative centre) by road. Berezovka is the nearest rural locality.

References 

Rural localities in Arkhangelsky District